Cotton Candy is a 1978 American made-for-television drama film directed by Ron Howard and broadcast on NBC. It is also known as Ron Howard's Cotton Candy.

Plot 
George Smalley is a high school senior trying to find direction in life. His attempt to land a spot on the varsity football team fails when he is cut from the team. A songwriter in his spare time, he and his pal, Corky Macpherson, recruit other local teens to form a rock band to ultimately perform in the town's Battle of the Bands competition. Together, they recruit a set of brothers who play keyboards and guitar, a former gang member on bass guitar, and a talented female drummer. Meanwhile, big man on campus Torbin Bequette leads a rival band, Rapid Fire (whose entire repertoire seems to consist of a hard rock version of "I Shot the Sheriff"), and attempts to undermine George and Corky's band.  The movie climaxes with the two bands going toe to toe in the Battle of the Bands final.

Production 
The film was the first production for Major H Productions, which Howard had created in 1977 with his father Rance and brother Clint.

Filming took place in Dallas, Texas, at Lake Highlands High School and at the Town East Mall for the Battle of the Bands event.

Cast 
 Charles Martin Smith as George Smalley
 Clint Howard as Corky Macpherson
 Leslie King as Brenda Matthews
 Manuel Padilla Jr. as Julio Sanchez
 Kevin Lee Miller as Barry Bates
 Dean Scofield as Bart Bates
 Rance Howard as Mr. Bremmercamp
 Mark Wheeler as Torbin Bequette
 Alvy Moore as Mr. Smalley
 Joan Crosby as Mrs. Smalley
 William H. Burkett as Mr. Barton
 Bill Hosmer as Uncredited Extra

References

External links 

1978 television films
1978 films
1978 drama films
Films directed by Ron Howard
Films scored by Joe Renzetti
NBC network original films
Films about musical groups
American drama television films
1970s American films